Aron Sele (born 2 September 1996) is a Liechtensteiner footballer who currently plays for FC Chur 97.

International career
He is a member of the Liechtenstein national football team, making his debut in a friendly match against Iceland on 6 June 2016. Sele also made 11 appearances for the Liechtenstein U21.

Honours

FC Vaduz
Liechtenstein Football Cup (1): 2018-19

References

1996 births
Living people
Liechtenstein footballers
Association football midfielders
FC Balzers players
FC Triesen players
Liechtenstein international footballers
Place of birth missing (living people)